Narinder may refer to:

Narinder Batth, Indian lyricist of Punjabi music
Narinder Kaur Bharaj, Indian politician and lawyer, member of legislative assembly from Sangrur Assembly constituency
Narinder Biba Punjabi singer from Punjab, India
Narinder Bragta (1952–2021), Member of the Himachal Pradesh Legislative Assembly for Jubbal-Kotkhai
Narinder Dhami (born 1958), British children's author
Narinder Kumar Gupta, research scientist, educator, and engineer
Narinder Singh Kapany FREng (1926–2020), Indian-American physicist working on fiber optics
Narinder Singh Kapoor (born 1944), Indian writer from Punjab
Narinder Kumar Mehra (born 1949), Indian immunologist, head of the department of transplant immunology and immunogenetics
Narinder Singh Randhawa (1927–1996), Indian agricultural scientist, writer, director general of the Indian Council of Agricultural Research
Narinder Singh Sandhu MVC (1932–2018), Indian Army officer awarded the Maha Vir Chakra for gallantry, leadership and devotion to duty
Narinder Pal Singh Sawna, Indian politician in the Punjab Legislative Assembly
Narinder Kumar Sharma, Indian politician and a member of Shiromani Akali Dal
Maharaja Narinder Singh KCSI (1824–1862), Maharaja of the princely state of Patiala from 1845 to 1862
Narinder Singh (cricketer) (born 1954), Indian former cricketer
Narinder Singh (judoka) (1969–2016), Indian judoka who competed at two Olympic Games
Narinder Thakur, Indian politician from the Bharatiya Janata Party
Narinder Nath Vohra (born 1936), the 12th governor of the Indian state of Jammu and Kashmir

See also
Narender
Narendra (disambiguation)
Narrandera